The 1989 Copa del Rey was the 53rd edition of the Spanish basketball Cup. It was organized by the ACB and its Final Eight was played in A Coruña, in the Pazo dos Deportes de Riazor between 15 and 17 November 1988.

This edition was played by the 24 teams of the 1988–89 ACB season. The eight first qualified teams of the previous season qualified directly to the Round of 16.

First round
Teams #2 played the second leg at home.

|}

Round of 16

|}

Final Eight Bracket

Final
Real Madrid won its 21st title thanks to 27 points of Petrović, who won at A Coruña his only title in Spain.

References

External links
Boxscores at ACB.com
Linguasport

Copa del Rey de Baloncesto
1988–89 in Spanish basketball